Roger Wagner (born 1957) is an English artist and poet.

Biography 
Born in 1957 in London, Roger Wagner won an open scholarship to read English Literature at Lincoln College, Oxford in 1975. While a student he attended classes at the Ruskin School of Drawing, where he now teaches, and in 1977 edited The Oxford Art Journal, the forerunner of the present academic journal that began the following year. From 1978 to 1981 he studied at The Royal Academy Schools under Peter Greenham, and subsequently returned to Oxford where he now lives and works.

In 1985 he had his first exhibition with Anthony Mould who has represented him ever since. Alongside the paintings were wood-engravings from his first book of illustrated poems Fire Sonnets. An exhibition in 1988, In a Strange Land, included a book of that title which included poems and a translation of psalm 137 illustrated with wood-engravings of the London docklands. Several more recent exhibitions have included successive volumes of The Book of Praises: an illustrated translation of the psalms, the first volume of which appeared in 1994. This was the year of his retrospective exhibition at the Ashmolean Museum in Oxford, whose attendance figures broke all records. In 2004 the Ashmolean had a second exhibition of his work to celebrate the acquisition of his large painting Menorah which now hangs on permanent loan in St Giles Church.

In 2012 he made his first stained glass window, opposite John Piper’s window in St Mary’s Iffley, followed by a font cover made in collaboration with Nicholas Mynheer. Both were nominated for the ACE prize for art in a sacred context. In 2014 he painted the first portrait of the new Archbishop of Canterbury, Justin Welby, which now hangs alongside Thomas Lawrence’s portraits in Auckland Castle. In 2016 Oxford University Press published The Penultimate Curiosity co-authored with Andrew Briggs, the Professor of Nanomaterials at Oxford.In 2019 The Canterbury Press published The Nearer You Stand, Poems and Images. In 2020 The Canterbury Press published The Book of Praise, Translations from the Psalms. In 2022 he was elected an Honorary Fellow of Lincoln College Oxford.

Style and influences 

Wagner’s work has been described as ‘totally unlike any other modern artist’. In 1988 the poet Peter Levi wrote of his second exhibition that ‘Nothing could be less expected than his paintings; they are completely careless of fashion. In some ways they are very old fashioned indeed, but in the most important way modern. He has the power to create a myth’.

An early influence was the painting of Giorgio de Chirico whom he met in Venice in 1973.  Chirico described his own style as ‘metaphysical’ and though very different the same term could be applied to Wagner’s work.  This has been described as ‘imbued with Fra Angelico, Blake, Palmer and Traherne’, but it also often imbued with what Samuel Johnson described as a characteristic of the metaphysical poets in which ‘the most heterogeneous ideas are yoked by violence together’. Thus Rowan Williams has described Wagner’s ‘fusion of Jewish and Christian symbols with the cooling towers of Didcot power station – Jewish victims of the Shoah wandering in the neighbourhood of a distantly seen, conventionally depicted crucifixion, the background dominated by the immense towers arranged in the pattern of the ceremonial candlestick, the menorah that gives this 1993 painting its title.’, as this is ‘very dense imagining indeed, but it manages a representation of the creatively and theologically uncanny that is haunting’.

Collections 
NatWest Collection, London
The Takeover Panel, City of London
The Ashmolean Museum, Oxford 
St Giles Church, Oxford 
Auckland Castle
Dioezesanmuseum, Regensburg
The Fitzwilliam Museum Cambridge

Bibliography 
Fire Sonnets, The Besalel Press 1984
In a Strange Land, The Besalel Press 1988 
The Book of Praises: A Translation of the Psalms, The Besalel Press 1994
A Silent Voice, The Besalel Press 1996 
Out of the Whirlwind, Solway 1997
Art and Faith, in Public Life and the Place of the Church, Ashgate 2006 
The Book of Praises: A Translation of the Psalms (Book Two), The Besalel Press 2008 
The Book of Praises: A Translation of the Psalms (Book Three), The Besalel Press 2013 
The Penultimate Curiosity (with Andrew Briggs) OUP 2016
 The Nearer You Stand, Poems and Images , Canterbury Press 2019
 The Book of Praises Translations from the Psalms Canterbury Press 2020

Further reading 
Roger Wagner Paintings 1982-1994. Chris Miller, The Ashmolean Museum 1994
Roger Wagner’s Visionary Landscapes. Rupert Martin, Image Journal Issue 10 1995
The Passion in Art. Rupert Martin, Ashgate 2004
Forms of Transcendence: The Art of Roger Wagner. Chris Miller, Piquant 2009
The Visionary Eye. Laura Gascoigne, The Tablet 17 November 2012
The Image of Christ in Modern Art. Richard Harries, Ashgate 2013
Master of Timeless Modernism. Patrick Heren, Standpoint Magazine March 2019

External links 
Standpoint Magazine
Roger Wagner's website
Image Journal : artist of the month : Roger Wagner

References 

1957 births
Living people
English male poets
Artists from London
Alumni of Lincoln College, Oxford
Alumni of the Ruskin School of Art
Alumni of the Royal Academy Schools